The Bulgarian men's national under-20 ice hockey team (Natsionalen otbor po khokeĭ na led na Bŭlgariya do 20 godini) is the national under-20 ice hockey team of Bulgaria. The team represents Bulgaria at the International Ice Hockey Federation's IIHF World Junior Championship Division III tournament.

International competitions

1983 World Juniors. Finish: 2nd in Pool C (18th overall)
1984 World Juniors. Finish: 2nd in Pool C (18th overall)
1985 World Juniors. Finish: 1st in Pool C (17th overall)
1986 World Juniors. Finish: 8th in Pool B (16th overall)
1987 World Juniors. Finish: 4th in Pool C (20th overall)
1988 World Juniors. Finish: 3rd in Pool C (19th overall)
1989 World Juniors. Finish: 5th in Pool C (21st overall)
1990 World Juniors. Finish: 4th in Pool C (20th overall)
1991 World Juniors. Finish: 6th in Pool C (22nd overall)
1992 World Juniors. Finish: 8th in Pool C (24th overall)
1993 World Juniors. Finish: 4th in Pool C (20th overall)
1994 World Juniors. Finish: 8th in Pool C (24th overall)
1995 World Juniors. Did not participate
1996 World Juniors. Finish: 5th in Pool D (31st overall)
1997 World Juniors. Finish: 6th in Pool D (32nd overall)
1998 World Juniors. Finish: 6th in Pool D (32nd overall)
1999 World Juniors. Finish: 7th in Pool D (33rd overall)
2000 World Juniors. Finish: 8th in Pool D (34th overall)
2001 World Juniors. Finish: 5th in Division III (31st overall)
2002 World Juniors. Finish: 8th in Division III (34th overall)
2003 World Juniors. Finish: 6th in Division II, Group A (34th overall)
2004 World Juniors. Finish: 5th in Division III (39th overall)
2005 World Juniors. Finish: 6th in Division III (40th overall)
2006 World Juniors. Finish: 4th in Division III (38th overall)
2007 World Juniors. Finish: 6th in Division III (40th overall)
2008 World Juniors. Finish: 7th in Division III (41st overall)
2009 World Juniors. Did not participate (tournament cancelled)
2010 World Juniors. Finish: 7th in Division III (41st overall)
2011 World Juniors. Finish: 6th in Division III (40th overall)
2012 World Juniors. Finish: 4th in Division III (38th overall)

Jun
Junior national ice hockey teams